Emiliella is a genus of African flowering plants in the daisy family.

 Species

References

Asteraceae genera
Senecioneae
Flora of Africa